Myrcianthes fragrans, commonly known as twinberry or Simpson's stopper, is a tree in the family of Myrtaceae, native to Florida, the United States Virgin Islands,  other countries within the Caribbean, Central America and northern South America. It is a common tree in moist tropical forests of the region.

Description

Myrcianthes fragrans can grow up to 6.096 m (20 ft) in length, the plant may grow as a shrub or small tree. It blooms white small flowers and green berries. The leaves are of a dark green color and give off a subtle nutmeg scent. The leaves are generally three inches in length and have an elliptical shape.

Usage

Used medically to treat gastrointestinal problems.

References

fragrans
Trees of Mexico
Trees of the United States